The women's tournament of the 2013 Canadian Senior Curling Championships was held from March 16 to 24 at the Silver Fox Curling & Yacht Club in Summerside, Prince Edward Island.

Qualifying round
Four associations did not automatically qualify to the championships, and participated in a qualifying round. Since Nunavut withdrew from competition, British Columbia, the Northwest Territories, and Yukon played in a double knockout to determine the two qualifiers.

Teams
The teams are listed as follows:

Knockout brackets

Knockout results

First knockout
Thursday, March 14, 2:30 pm

Thursday, March 14, 7:00 pm

Second knockout
Friday, March 15, 8:00 am

Teams
The teams are listed as follows:

Round-robin standings
Final round-robin standings

Round-robin results
All draw times are listed in Atlantic Daylight Time (UTC-3).

Draw 1
Saturday, March 16, 10:00 am

Draw 3
Saturday, March 16, 7:00 pm

Draw 5
Sunday, March 17, 2:30 pm

Draw 6
Sunday, March 17, 7:00 pm

Draw 7
Monday, March 18, 10:00 am

Draw 8
Monday, March 18, 2:30 pm

Draw 9
Monday, March 18, 7:00 pm

Draw 10
Tuesday, March 19, 10:00 am

Draw 11
Tuesday, March 19, 2:30 pm

Draw 12
Tuesday, March 19, 7:00 pm

Draw 13
Wednesday, March 20, 10:00 am

Draw 14
Wednesday, March 20, 2:30 pm

Draw 15
Wednesday, March 20, 7:00 pm

Draw 17
Thursday, March 21, 12:00 pm

Draw 19
Thursday, March 21, 8:00 pm

Draw 21
Friday, March 22, 2:30 pm

Tiebreaker
Saturday, March 23, 8:00 am

Playoffs

Semifinal
Saturday, March 23, 2:00 pm

Final
Sunday, March 24, 11:00 am

References

External links

Host committee website

2013, Women's tournament
2013 in Canadian curling
Sport in Summerside, Prince Edward Island
Curling competitions in Prince Edward Island
2013 in Prince Edward Island